Petal Head is an American Indie Rock band from Long Island, New York, United States. The band currently consists of Michael Guidice, Andy Laurino, Brandan Cox. The band has released a full-length and 1 EP to date on Dead Broke Rekerds.

Background
Petal Head was formed in 2014 after the dissolution of Singer/Guitarist Michael Guidice's previous band Seawave. Guidice recruited bassist Andy Laurino and drummer Brandan Cox and began performing under the name Vape. Soon after recording a 2-song demo under that name- the band changed their name to Petal Head and began work on their debut full length. The album- titled Raspberry Cough was released September 1, 2015 on Dead Broke Rekerds with a music video filmed for lead single "Spooky Something". The band followed the album in 2016 with the 3 song In My Head Dreams Melt EP- also released by Dead Broke Rekerds.

Members
Michael Guidice – Guitar, Vocals (2014–Present)
Andy Laurino – Bass (2014–Present)
Brandan Cox – Drums (2014–Present)
Rob Rice – Guitar (2021–Present)

Discography
2015: Raspberry Cough

EP's & Singles
2014: Demo (As Vape)
2016: In My Head Dreams Melt
2018: Darkworld

References

Musical groups established in 2014
Musical groups from New York (state)
Musical groups from Long Island
2014 establishments in New York (state)